Volkovskaya (Волковская) railway station is a nodal railway station within Saint Petersburg railway system in Russia. It was created in 1900 in a historical location on the crossroads of several important railway lines ascending to initial formation of the whole Russia's railway network, where the Connecting Line and Putilovskaya Line had a joint section.

It has been generally used for freight distributing, but recent plans of city's railway network expansion suppose that it is transformed into a large passenger hub interconnecting with the nearby Volkovskaya metro station. 

The name is after nearby village (in Russian)

See also 
 Tovarnaya line

References

Railway stations in Saint Petersburg